Clouds is the third full-length album by Tiamat, issued in 1992 through Century Media Records. It continues the extreme sound of previous albums with more melodic, gothic rock-inspired elements, including occasional clean singing, while retaining extremely heavy instrumentation and Johan Edlund's death growl.

Track listing

Personnel
Johan Edlund - vocal, rhythm guitar, acoustic guitar
Thomas Petersson - guitars, acoustic guitar
Johnny Hagel - bass
Kenneth Roos - keyboards
Niklas Ekstrand - drums
Jonas Malmsten – additional keyboards

Covers
German gothic metal band The Vision Bleak covered "The Sleeping Beauty" on their 2016 EP The Kindred of the Sunset.

References

1992 albums
Tiamat (band) albums
Albums with cover art by Kristian Wåhlin
Albums produced by Waldemar Sorychta